William Sandham (30 June 1898 – 1963) was an English footballer who played as an inside forward for Blackburn Rovers and Rochdale. He was joint top goal scorer (with George Guy) for Rochdale in 1922–23.

References

Rochdale A.F.C. players
Blackburn Rovers F.C. players
English footballers
1898 births
1963 deaths
People from Fleetwood
Association footballers not categorized by position